Fontainebleau (also spelled Fountainebleau) is a census-designated place (CDP) in Miami-Dade County, Florida, United States. The population was 59,870 during the 2020 census.

Geography
It is bordered to the west by the city of Sweetwater, to the north by the city of Doral, and to the south by unincorporated Westchester.

Economy

Lennar, a home construction company, is headquartered at 700 Northwest 107th Avenue in Fontainebleau.

Demographics

2020 census

As of the 2020 United States census, there were 59,870 people, 22,887 households, and 17,235 families residing in the CDP.

2010 census

As of 2010, there were 23,181 households, with 6.5% being vacant. In 2000, 34.9% had children under the age of 18 living with them, 49.6% were married couples living together, 18.6% had a female householder with no husband present, and 25.4% were non-families. 18.4% of all households were made up of individuals, and 6.1% had someone living alone who was 65 years of age or older.  The average household size was 2.85 and the average family size was 3.22.

2000 census
In 2000, the CDP the population was spread out, with 22.7% under the age of 18, 9.8% from 18 to 24, 34.0% from 25 to 44, 21.0% from 45 to 64, and 12.4% who were 65 years of age or older.  The median age was 35 years. For every 100 females, there were 86.9 males.  For every 100 females age 18 and over, there were 82.7 males.

In 2000, the median income for a household in the CDP was $35,509, and the median income for a family was $36,161. Males had a median income of $27,380 versus $22,143 for females. The per capita income for the CDP was $14,716.  About 11.9% of families and 14.2% of the population were below the poverty line, including 18.7% of those under age 18 and 15.5% of those age 65 or over.

As of 2000, speakers of Spanish accounted for 91.29% of residents, while those who spoke only English made up 6.25%.

History
The neighborhood takes its name from the famed Miami Beach resort. In 1970, Ben Novack, the Fontainebleau's original owner, grew jealous of Doris and Alfred Kaskel's plans in Doral and wanted to create his own planned golf course, resort, and community. It was to be known as Fontainebleau Park. Novack, however, soon fell into financial problems (and the Fontainebleau Park would play a part in the hotel's foreclosure in 1977). The company Trafalgar Developers would go on to develop the community under the "Fontainebleau" name, but no link to the famed hotel would ever be mentioned in promotional materials when the community opened in the 1970s.

The community of Fontainebleau Park itself was a collection of sub-divided villages around two 18-hole golf courses. (East and West course now closed and built upon). The original sales office for Trafalgar Development was located at what is now the Fontainebleau Office Park located at the main Fontainebleau Park entrance and West Flagler Street. Fontainebleau Park West's sales office (west of N.W. 97th Avenue) was at what is now "Soleil Condominiums". While the eastern half of the community was heavily designed for condominiums and apartments, the western portion of the community included "Village Homes", single-family homes, "Garden Homes", and townhomes.

Education
Miami-Dade County Public Schools operates public schools in the Fontainebleau area. Charles R. Hadley Elementary School,  Seminole Elementary School, and E.W.F. Stirrup Elementary School, and Ruben Dario Middle School are in Fontainebleau.

Miami Christian School and Vann Academy are in Fontainebleau.

The Roman Catholic Archdiocese of Miami previously operated Our Lady of Divine Providence School in Fontainebleau CDP. It closed in 2009.

The Engineering Center of Florida International University is in Fontainebleau.

References

External links
 Ruben Dario Middle School
 Charles R. Hadley Elementary School
 Seminole Elementary School
 E.W.F. Stirrup Elementary School

Census-designated places in Miami-Dade County, Florida
Census-designated places in Florida